Closer was an American four-piece rock band from New York City with Harley Di Nardo (vocals, guitars), Derrek Hawkins (guitars) and David Cartategui (bass) and Jonathan Nanberg (drums).  In the late 1990s, after starting off with the name Velour, the band played NYC clubs such as The Continental, Coney Island High, CBGBs, Mercury Lounge and The Spiral Lounge and caught the attention of Revolution/Giant Records, a Warner Bros Records imprint label. 

After signing to Revolution/Giant Records, the band asked Ed Buller to produce their debut release.  Recording starting in late 1996 at The Record Plant in Sausalito, California and, in September 1997, Don't Walk was released. Don't Walk reflects the band's musical influences; British glitter rock artists of the 1970s, as well as, Britpop acts of the 1990s.

Shortly after releasing Don't Walk, the band toured with Love Spit Love, Supergrass and Chumbawamba.

References

Alternative rock groups from New York (state)
American glam rock musical groups